is a Japanese former figure skater. She is the 2007 Junior Grand Prix Final bronze medalist and represented Japan at two World Junior Championships. She won silver medals at two senior internationals, the 2011 NRW Trophy and 2012 Gardena Spring Trophy.

Programs

Competitive highlights

Detailed results

References

 2005-2006 Japanese Novice Championships
 2006-2007 Japanese Novice Championships
 2007-2008 Japanese Junior Championships
 2006-2007 13th Mladost Trophy

External links

 

1993 births
Japanese female single skaters
Living people
Sportspeople from Osaka Prefecture
Competitors at the 2015 Winter Universiade